"Give a Little Love Back to the World", written and composed by Paul Curtis, was the 's entry at the Eurovision Song Contest 1990, performed by Emma. At the age of 15, Emma was the youngest-ever entrant on behalf of the United Kingdom at Eurovision.

Selection process
Emma won the right to perform at the contest, held in Zagreb by winning the UK national final, A Song for Europe, where she was the fourth singer to perform. Like in 1988 and 1989, the winner was picked via a nationwide telephone vote, and Emma emerged victorious, receiving nearly three times as many votes as the second-place finisher (clocking in at just under 100,000 supporters).

At Eurovision
In Zagreb, the song was performed seventh on the night, after 's Céline Carzo with "Quand je te rêve", and before 's Stjórnin with "Eitt lag enn". At the end of judging that evening, "Give a Little Love Back to the World" took the sixth-place slot with 87 points. Belgium awarded the UK its only 12 points for the evening.

One large theme of Eurovision 1990 in Zagreb was unity and peace, as the contest came mere months after the fall of communism in most of Eastern Europe. Emma's song strayed from this larger theme somewhat in that her song was a plea for environmentalism. Emma, dressed in red, was flanked by five backup singers: three women (in blue dresses) and two men (in alternating white and blue trousers, vests and shirts).

Charts
After Eurovision, the song placed at No. 33 on the UK Singles Chart, in the best chart placing by a UK Eurovision act since 1984.

References

Eurovision songs of the United Kingdom
Eurovision songs of 1990
1990 in British music
1990 singles
Songs written by Paul Curtis (musician)
1990 songs
Environmental songs